Sex Appeal is a 2022 American teen sex comedy film directed by Talia Osteen in her feature-film length directorial debut, from a screenplay by Tate Hanyok. The film stars Mika Abdalla, Jake Short, Margaret Cho, Paris Jackson and Fortune Feimster.

Plot
Avery Hansen-White holds herself back from doing things she's not excellent at. So when her long-distance boyfriend seems to want to take their relationship to the next level at the upcoming STEM conference ("nerd prom"), she resolves to master her sexuality. Avery starts studying the mechanics of love and realizes that relationships involve less science and more heart.

Cast

Production
In March 2021, it was revealed that American High was developing a teen comedy for Hulu called Sex Appeal, with Mika Abdalla and Jake Short set to star in the film. The same month, it was reported that Talia Osteen would direct the film in her directorial debut for Hulu, while Tate Hanyok would serve as the screenwriter and one of the executive producers. In April 2021, Margaret Cho, Paris Jackson, Rebecca Henderson, and Skai Jackson were announced to star in the movie.

Release
The film was released on January 14, 2022 on Hulu. Internationally, the movie became available through Disney+ starting on April 8, 2022. In Latin America, the film was released as a Star+ original on March 18, 2022.

Reception
On the review aggregator website Rotten Tomatoes, 55% of 20 critics' reviews are positive, with an average rating of 5.90/10.

Jennifer Green of Common Sense Media rated the film 3 out of 5 stars and praised the positive message of the movie on romantic relationships, while complimenting the diversity of the cast. Aurora Amidon of Paste rated the movie 5,8 out of 10, praised how the movie approaches the lose of virginity with humor, but found the lack of knowledge on sex of Mika Abdalla's character nonsensical due to her mastery on science and the presence of her sex-positive parents. Ferdosa of Screen Rant rated the film 2 out of 5 stars, complimented that the movie manages to deliver a positive take on sexual relationships, while praising the performance of Abdalla, but stated that the film does not develop the characters enough through their dialogues compared to other teen sex comedy movies.

References

External links
  at Hulu
 

2022 films
American teen comedy films
American teen romance films
Teen sex comedy films
2020s high school films
2022 directorial debut films
Hulu original films
2020s English-language films
2020s American films